Chana Schneerson (née Yanovsky; 1880–1964) was the wife of Rabbi Levi Yitzchak Schneerson, a Chabad Hasidic rabbi in Yekatrinoslav, Ukraine and the mother of the seventh Chabad-Lubavitch Rebbe, Rabbi Menachem Mendel Schneerson. 

Chana Schneerson's grandfather is Abraham David Lavut, a marked composer of Jewish literature upon which Chabadic prayer books are based (i.e. the Siddur Im Dach).

Early life 

She was born Chana Yanovsky in 1880, on the 28th of Tevet in the city of Nikolayev, Ukraine to Rabbi  and Rachel Yanovsky.  She was the eldest of four children, having two sisters, Gittel and Ettel, and a younger brother, Yisrael Leib, who died in his youth. Rabbi Meir Shlomo was the chief rabbi of Nikolayev.

As a teenager, she was educated by her father, and when an article (a 'maamar'-i.e. Chasidic discourse) would arrive from Lubavitch, she would meticulously and faithfully transcribe it, making it available for other Chasidim.

Marriage to Levi Yitzchak 
In 1900, she married Levi Yitzchak, a great-great-grandson of the third Rebbe of Lubavitch, Rabbi Menachem Mendel Schneersohn, also known as the Tzemach Tzedek. The wedding took place on the 13th of Sivan, in Nikolayev. The couple produced three sons, Menachem Mendel, Dov-ber, and Yisroel Aryeh Leib. Their eldest son, Menachem Mendel, was later to become the seventh Rebbe of Lubavitch.

Levi Yitzchak was arrested in 1939, and exiled in 1940 for his religious practice. Schneerson joined him in exile. Levi Yitzchak died in 1944.

Later years 
Widowed, Schneerson left the Soviet Union in 1947. She transported Levi Yitzchak's religious writings, considered illegal contraband under the communist soviet regime, focused around the Kabbalah, upon moving. That year she went to Paris, France, where she met with her son, Menachem Mendel. They both immigrated to the United States, and lived in Brooklyn, New York.

She held extensive interviews with journalist Nissan Gordon, which have been published in Di Yiddishe Heim.

She died on September 12, 1964 (6 Tishrei 5725).

In 2012, her memoirs, which she penned during the years 1947 until 1963, were published by the Kehot Publication Society.

References

Further reading 
 Gottlieb, Naftali Tzvi. Trans. Lesches, Elchonon. "Rabbi, Mystic and Leader - the Life and Times of Rabbi Levi Yitzchak Schneerson" (Kehot Publication Society; 2008) 253 pages
 Marcus, Shmuel M. and Avraham D. Vaisfiche. Rebbetzin Chana Schneerson: A Brief Biography. Brooklyn: Kehot Publication Society. (2004). 
 Strength and Majesty: A Biography of the Rebbetzins Chana Schneerson and Chaya Mushka Schneerson. Brooklyn: Merkos L'Inyonei Chinuch (2004). 
 Tilles, Yerachmiel. "A Mother in Israel - the Life and Memoirs of Rebbetzin Chana Schneerson" (Kehot Publication Society; 1985, 2003) 226 pages

External links 
 Memoirs of Rebbetzin Chana Schneerson

1880 births
1964 deaths
Chabad-Lubavitch (Hasidic dynasty)
Schneersohn family
People from Mykolaiv
Rebbetzins of Lubavitch